Barnard Stadium is a sports stadium situated in Kempton Park, South Africa.  It is the home of the Falcons Rugby Union team.

The stadium is situated next to the Kempton Park Golf Club, and has a small grand stand and flood lighting.

References

Kempton Park, Gauteng
Rugby union stadiums in South Africa
Sports venues in Gauteng